Aditi Vasudev is an Indian actress, known for her roles in the comedy-drama film Do Dooni Chaar (2010) and the comedy film Sulemani Keeda (2014). She has made her TV debut in the serial Meri Aawaaz Hi Pehchaan Hain in February 2016, with her role as the young Ketaki, along with Amrita Rao, who also made her TV debut in the same serial playing Kalyani, the elder sister of Ketaki. The TV serial is telecast on &TV channel.

Early life and education
Vasudev attended Welham Girls School in Dehradun, and then moved to Mumbai to attend the Barry John School for three months.

Career
She started her career with the small but successful film Do Dooni Chaar, directed by Habib Faisal. She was recommended by her co-star for her role in Sulemani Keeda. Though she was not convinced about the film in the conception stage, she got on board when she liked the final draft.

Filmography

Television

See also

 List of Indian film actresses
 List of people from Mumbai

References

External links
 
 

Year of birth missing (living people)
Place of birth missing (living people)
20th-century births
20th-century Indian actresses
21st-century Indian actresses
Actresses from Mumbai
Actresses in Hindi cinema
Indian film actresses
Living people
Welham Girls' School alumni